Orahova is populated place in Bosnia and Herzegovina, Republika Srpska, Kotor-Varoš Municipality. Orahova includes two hamlets: Gornja (Upper, 540 m) and Lower  (350 m) Orahova.

The centerpiece of the new village is located on the river Vrbanja river with the mouth of its tributary Vigošća.

History
During the Bosnian War, all Croat and Muslim villages in the area were destroyed, and residents killed and expelled. Today there is almost no Croat population left in the area.

Population

References

External links 
 Official site of Kotor-Varoš Municipality

Villages in Republika Srpska
Kotor Varoš